Susan Jane Colley (née Morris, born 1959) is an American mathematician. She is Andrew and Pauline Delaney Professor of Mathematics at Oberlin College, and a former editor-in-chief of the American Mathematical Monthly. Her mathematical research specialty is enumerative geometry.

Colley went to the Massachusetts Institute of Technology (MIT) as an undergraduate, and earned her Ph.D. at MIT in 1983.
Her dissertation, On the Enumerative Geometry of Stationary Multiple-points, was supervised by Steven Kleiman.
Colley's main research interests are algebraic geometry and related areas, particularly enumerative geometry, .

Colley joined the faculty of Oberlin College in 1983 as an assistant professor.  She was promoted to professor in 1995 and chaired the Department of Mathematics at Oberlin from 1994—1997 and again from 2011—2014. She was appointed the Andrew and Pauline Delaney Professor of Mathematics in 1999 and still holds that position.

Colley was on the board of editors of the Mathematical Association of America (MAA) publication The College Mathematics Journal from 2010 –2018. She served on the board of editors of the MAA publication Focus from 2011–2015.
She became editor of the American Mathematical Monthly beginning in 2017; she was the first woman to hold this position.

Colley is the author of the textbook Vector Calculus (Prentice Hall, 1997; 4th ed., Pearson, 2011).

References

External links
 Home page
 Susan Jane Colley's Author Profile on MathSciNet

1959 births
Living people
20th-century American mathematicians
21st-century American mathematicians
American women mathematicians
Oberlin College faculty
20th-century American women
Massachusetts Institute of Technology alumni
Algebraic geometers
21st-century American women
The American Mathematical Monthly editors